Stephen Andrew Baldwin (born May 12, 1966) is an American actor, producer and director. He has appeared in the films Born on the Fourth of July (1989), Posse (1993), 8 Seconds (1994), Threesome (1994), The Usual Suspects (1995), Bio-Dome (1996) and The Flintstones in Viva Rock Vegas (2000). Baldwin also starred in the television series The Young Riders (1989–1992) and as himself in the reality shows Celebrity Big Brother 7, which he placed 9th, in the United Kingdom and Celebrity Apprentice. In 2004, he directed Livin' It, a Christian-themed skateboarding DVD. He is the youngest of the four Baldwin brothers.

Early life
Baldwin was born in Massapequa, New York, the youngest son of Carol Newcomb (née Martineau), founder of The Baldwin Fund, and Alexander Rae Baldwin Jr., a high school social studies teacher and football coach. Baldwin's elder brothers are actors Alec, Daniel and William, collectively known as the "Baldwin brothers". He was raised in the Catholic faith. In high school, Baldwin participated on the varsity wrestling team, along with William. Baldwin has two elder sisters, Elizabeth Keuchler and Jane Sasso. Baldwin attended the American Academy of Dramatic Arts.

Career
Baldwin began acting on television and made his film debut in The Beast. He starred in the western television series The Young Riders and in Threesome (1994). Baldwin landed a breakthrough role in The Usual Suspects (1995) and played Barney Rubble in The Flintstones in Viva Rock Vegas (2000). He participated in Celebrity Mole Hawaii, the first celebrity edition of The Mole in 2002. ABC broadcast the program in early 2003. Later that year, he returned for Celebrity Mole Yucatán, which ABC aired in early 2004. In 2006, Baldwin played a villainous thug in the television film Jesse Stone: Night Passage. In August 2007, Baldwin returned to television, when CMT cast him in Ty Murray's Celebrity Bull Riding Challenge, one of nine celebrities cast. In the first episode, Baldwin was injured in a bad fall from a wooden pontoon, breaking his shoulder blade and cracking a rib. Under doctor's orders, he left the show in the second episode. From January to March 2008, Baldwin appeared on Donald Trump's Celebrity Apprentice on NBC. He finished fifth out of the 14 celebrity contestants. He and Trace Adkins became friends while competing on the show. In October 2008, Baldwin appeared in Adkins's music video, "Muddy Water". In March 2013, Baldwin returned to compete in All-Star Celebrity Apprentice. He was a contestant on the 2009 NBC reality show I'm a Celebrity…Get Me out of Here!. Baldwin quit the show mid-season. On the second episode, he baptized The Hills actor Spencer Pratt. In 2019, Baldwin starred in a Filipino film, Kaibigan.

Personal life

Baldwin resides in the village of Nyack, New York, with his wife, the Brazilian graphic designer Kennya Baldwin (née Deodato), whom he met in 1987 and married in 1990. They have two daughters, Alaia and Hailey Bieber; both are models. His father-in-law is Brazilian composer Eumir Deodato, and Canadian singer Justin Bieber is his son-in-law through marriage to his daughter Hailey.

In 2006, Baldwin launched a campaign to prevent an adult bookstore from opening in Nyack. He has a tattoo on his left shoulder of the initials "HM" for Hannah Montana. He got the tattoo after making a pact with Miley Cyrus that he would be allowed to cameo on the show if he had the initials tattooed on him. He revealed the tattoo to Cyrus at a book signing in Nashville on November 10, 2008. He was never given the opportunity to appear on the show and has since said that he regrets getting the tattoo.

In June 2009, Baldwin's foreclosed $515,000, 1.4-acre home in Rockland County, New York was publicly auctioned after he and his wife defaulted on more than $824,000 in mortgage payments. In July, Baldwin filed for Chapter 11 bankruptcy protection claiming more than $2.3 million in debt. Court papers showed he owed $1.2 million on two mortgages on a New York property valued at only $1.1 million, more than $1 million in taxes and credit card debt.

Baldwin was the first person to enter the Celebrity Big Brother house on January 3, 2010. The theme for this series was "Hell", with a devil head on the front door. He frequently taunted the head by saying "you're a loser". During his stay in the house, he frequently read passages from the Bible to his fellow housemates. He failed to win many fans and was evicted on January 22, 2010, becoming the fourth housemate to be evicted. In a three-way vote—against Ivana Trump and Sisqó—he received 50% of the public vote. After his eviction, the website restorestephenbaldwin.org, unsolicited by him, began soliciting cash donations to improve Baldwin's career.

In December 2010, Baldwin filed a $3.8 million lawsuit against Kevin Costner over oil-separating technology that was used to help solve the BP oil spill in the Gulf of Mexico. In June 2012, a jury sided with Costner and awarded Baldwin no damages. In March 2013, Baldwin pleaded guilty to failing to file income taxes for the years 2008, 2009, and 2010. He stated that he never intended to avoid paying taxes and that he had received bad advice from lawyers and accountants. Baldwin agreed to pay $300,000 within a year, or he would be sentenced to five years' probation and have five years to pay the money.

Views

Religion 

In September 2006, Baldwin released his book titled The Unusual Suspect, which details highlights from his personal life, career, days of drug abuse and his turn to becoming a born-again Evangelical after the September 11 attacks in 2001. In the same year, Baldwin, Mario D'Ortenzio and Bobby Brewer founded Breakthrough Ministry, which was designed to use extreme sports as a ministry via arena tours, called AsSalt Tours. The tours featured extreme sports celebrities, including Christian Hosoi.

In late 2008, Baldwin formed a for-profit organization called Antioch Ministry, which exists "to facilitate the gifts and calling of Stephen Baldwin." In 2009, Baldwin launched a third ministry called Now More Than Ever, designed to reach enlisted men and women in the U.S. armed services around the world. In 2008, Baldwin teamed up with conservative talk-radio host Kevin McCullough to put together a Saturday radio show called Baldwin/McCullough Radio. As of April 18, 2009, the show aired on 213 stations and in more than 400 cities across the US and worldwide on Sirius 161 and XM 227. Baldwin appears weekly on the show from the broadcast studios in New York City and from various locations around the country when he is traveling for other business purposes.

Politics 

In 2007, Baldwin endorsed Sam Brownback for U.S. President. After Brownback ended his campaign, Baldwin switched his support to Mike Huckabee. Baldwin was an outspoken advocate of the John McCain–Sarah Palin presidential ticket after Huckabee dropped out of the 2008 presidential election.

In 2011, Baldwin mentioned the possibility of entering New York City's 2013 mayoral election as an opponent of his brother Alec, who had suggested that he may run himself.

Baldwin was among the first Hollywood celebrities to endorse Donald Trump in the 2016 presidential election.

Filmography

Film

Television

Director

Awards

References

External links

 
 
 The Breakthrough Ministry
 Livin' It (Action Sports Ministry that Baldwin co-founded)
 Article about Baldwin's quest to close a porn store in Nyack, from Rockland Magazine
 Baldwin McCullough Radio
 Stephen Baldwin and America's Culture War An article by Alexander Osang featured in Der Spiegel, August 4, 2006
 Video of Stephen Baldwin talking about his conversion
  Premier Christian TV interview with Stephen Baldwin about his experiences in Celebrity Big Brother house

1966 births
Living people
20th-century American male actors
21st-century American male actors
21st-century evangelicals
American Academy of Dramatic Arts alumni
American conservative talk radio hosts
American evangelicals
American film producers
American male film actors
American male television actors
American people of Irish descent
The Apprentice (franchise) contestants
Stephen
Berner High School alumni
Converts to evangelical Christianity from Roman Catholicism
Film directors from New York (state)
Male actors from New York (state)
New York (state) Republicans
Participants in American reality television series
People from Massapequa, New York
People from Rockland County, New York